Heliscomyidae is a family of extinct rodents from the mid-Tertiary of North America related to pocket gophers (family Geomyidae) and kangaroo rats and their relatives (family Heteromyidae).  The family contains four genera, Apletotomeus, Heliscomys, Passaliscomys, and Tylionomys (Korth et al., 1991; Korth and Eaton, 2004; Korth and Branciforte, 2007). McKenna and Bell (1997) placed the first two genera in synonymy, with Heliscomys the senior synonym.

Characteristics
Heliscomyids are distinguished from other geomyoid rodents by several characteristics of the skull including fusion of three cranial foramina, elongation of the incisive foramina, and an unusual position of the mental foramen (Korth et al., 1991).

Taxonomy
Heliscomyidae is a member of the clade Geomyoidea, a group of rodents that also includes the families †Eomyidae, †Florentiamyidae, Heteromyidae, and Geomyidae.  The following cladogram showing interrelationships among geomyoid families follows Korth et al. (1991):

References
Korth, W.W. and C. Branciforte, 2007. Geomyoid rodents (Mammalia) from the Ridgeview Local Fauna, early-early Arikareean (late Oligocene) of western Nebraska. Annals of Carnegie Museum 76(3):177-201.
Korth, W.W. and J.G. Eaton, 2004. Rodents and a marsupial (Mammalia) from the Duchesnean (Eocene) Turtle Basin Local Fauna, Sevier Plateau, Utah. Bulletin of Carnegie Museum of Natural History 36(1):109-119.
Korth, W.W., J.H. Wahlert, and R.J. Emry, 1991. A new species of Heliscomys and recognition of the family Heliscomyidae (Geomyoidea: Rodentia) Journal of Vertebrate Paleontology 11(2):247-256.
McKenna, Malcolm C., and Bell, Susan K. 1997. Classification of Mammals Above the Species Level. Columbia University Press, New York, 631 pp. 

Geomyoid rodents
Prehistoric rodent families
Eocene first appearances
Miocene extinctions